Erlin is an unincorporated community in Sandusky County, in the U.S. state of Ohio.

History
A post office called Erlin was established in 1883, and remained in operation until 1910. Besides the post office, Erlin had a railroad station.

References

Unincorporated communities in Sandusky County, Ohio
Unincorporated communities in Ohio